Jorge Vigón Suero-Díaz (18 May 1893 – 13 February 1978) was a Spanish general who served as Minister of Public Works of Spain between 1957 and 1965, during the Francoist dictatorship.

References

1893 births
1978 deaths
Government ministers during the Francoist dictatorship